Jindric "Jin" Sagalongos Macapagal (born July 29, 1995) is a Filipino actor, model and dancer. He is the Ultimate BidaMan of It's Showtime's competition for the Philippines' newest leading man BidaMan.

Early life and education
Macapagal was born on July 29, 1995. He is the youngest of three children of Carlo Macapagal, a Manileño and Agnes Sagalongos, a Cebuana. His first name Jindric is derived from his elder brothers' names. Their names are Jin and Cedric.

In 2017, he graduated with a major in Physical Therapy from Cebu Doctors’ University.

Career

2016: Pinoy Boyband Superstar
In 2016 (as Jindric Macapagal), he auditioned at ABS-CBN's competition on search for the newest boyband in the Philippines Pinoy Boyband Superstar where he got 95% of the votes from the all-girl audience on the first round. He made it at the Top 20 but did not make it at the Top 12 stage.

2019–present: It's Showtime
In 2019, Macapagal auditioned on It's Showtime's segment BidaMan, a search for newest leading man in the Philippines. He was renamed as Jin Macapagal. On March 23, 2019, he was the Week 2 winner.

On August 10, 2019, at the grand finals, he was hailed as the Ultimate BidaMan.

Filmography

Movies

Television

Web series

Accolades

Movies

Television

References

1995 births
Living people
Filipino male television actors
Filipino male dancers
Filipino male models
People from Cebu City